Gabriela Anna Kownacka (née Kwasz) (25 May 1952, Wrocław – 30 November 2010, Warsaw) was a Polish film and stage actress, best known for playing in the Polish TV series Rodzina zastępcza. Kownacka was a Lutheran.

She has starred in over 60 television theater roles and starred in over 40 theater productions across the country.

By the decision of the President of the Republic of Poland of August 22, 2005, she was awarded the Cross of Merit.

Kownacka died on 30 November 2010, aged 58, after a long battle with breast cancer that began in 2004. On 7 December 2010, she was interred at the Evangelical Cemetery of the Augsburg Confession in Warsaw.

Filmography
 1972: The Wedding – Zosia
 1975: Skazany – Kasia
 1976: Trędowata – Rita Szylinżanka
 1977: Ciuciubabka – Grażyna
 1977: Pani Bovary to ja
 1977: Rebus – Ania
 1977: Rekolekcje – Myszka
 1977: Szarada – Ewa
 1978: Hallo Szpicbródka – Anita
 1980: Urodziny młodego warszawiaka – Jadźka
 1980: Ukryty w słońcu – Joanna
 1980: Bo oszalałem dla niej – Sylwia
 1981: Dziecinne pytania – Bożena
 1981: Przypadki Piotra S. – prostitute
 1981: Spokojne lata – Iza
 1983: Nadzór – Danusia Wabik
 1984: Jak się pozbyć czarnego kota – Krystyna Danek
 1984: Pismak – Maria
 1984: Zamiana – Ola
 1985: Kronika wypadków miłosnych – Olimpia
 1985: Ga, ga. Chwała bohaterom – blondie woman
 1985: Żaglowiec – Michael's mother
 1985: Czarny kot
 1986: Nieproszony gość
 1987: Hanussen – wife
 1988: Niezwykła podróż Baltazara Kobera – Gertruda
 1989: Kapitał, czyli jak zrobić pieniądze w Polsce – Barbara
 1989: Yacht – wife
 1992: Smacznego telewizorku – Teresa Adler
 1992: Sauna – Masza
 1992: Zwolnieni z życia – Elżbieta
 1993: Les Nouveaux Exploits d'Arsene Lupin
 1995–1998: Matki, żony i kochanki – Dorota Padlewska-Lindner
 1996: Cesarska tabakierka – Baronowa
 1996: Dzieci i ryby – Ewelina
 1999: Fuks – Alex's mother
 1999: Kiler-ów 2-óch – president's wife
 1999: Rodzina zastępcza – Anna Kwiatkowska
 1999: Bratobójstwo
 2001: Pas de deux – Anna Struziakowa
 2002: Na dobre i na złe – Lidia Kornecka, menadżerka Niki
 2003: Powiedz to, Gabi – actress
 2006: Przebacz – mother
 2007: Dwie strony medalu – Jolanta Wysocka
 2007: Niania – herself

References

External links
 

1952 births
2010 deaths
20th-century Polish actresses
21st-century Polish actresses
Actors from Wrocław
Deaths from cancer in Poland
Deaths from breast cancer
Polish Lutherans
Polish film actresses
Polish stage actresses
Polish television actresses
Polish voice actresses
Recipients of the Gold Cross of Merit (Poland)
20th-century Lutherans
Aleksander Zelwerowicz National Academy of Dramatic Art in Warsaw alumni
Burials at Evangelical-Augsburg Cemetery, Warsaw